In general topology, a branch of mathematics, the Appert topology, named for , is a topology on the set } of positive integers.
In the Appert topology, the open sets are those that do not contain 1, and those that asymptotically contain almost every positive integer.  The space X with the Appert topology is called the Appert space.

Construction 

For a subset S of X, let  denote the number of elements of S which are less than or equal to n:

S is defined to be open in the Appert topology if either it does not contain 1 or if it has asymptotic density equal to 1, i.e., it satisfies
.

The empty set is open because it does not contain 1, and the whole set X is open since
 for all n.

Related topologies 
The Appert topology is closely related to the Fort space topology that arises from giving the set of integers greater than one the discrete topology, and then taking the point 1 as the point at infinity in a one point compactification of the space.  The Appert topology is finer than the Fort space topology, as any cofinite subset of X has asymptotic density equal to 1.

Properties
 The closed subsets S of X are those that either  contain 1 or that have zero asymptotic density, namely .

 Every point of X has a local basis of clopen sets, i.e., X is a zero-dimensional space.Proof: Every open neighborhood of 1 is also closed.  For any ,  is both closed and open.

 X is Hausdorff and perfectly normal (T6).Proof: X is T1.  Given any two disjoint closed sets A and B, at least one of them, say A, does not contain 1.  A is then clopen and A and its complement are disjoint respective neighborhoods of A and B, which shows that X is normal and Hausdorff.  Finally, any subset, in particular any closed subset, in a countable T1 space is a Gδ, so X is perfectly normal.

 X is countable, but not first countable, and hence not second countable and not metrizable.

 A subset of X is compact if and only if it is finite.  In particular, X is not locally compact, since there is no compact neighborhood of 1.

 X is not countably compact.Proof: The infinite set  has zero asymptotic density, hence is closed in X.  Each of its points is isolated.  Since X contains an infinite closed discrete subset, it is not limit point compact, and therefore it is not countably compact.

See also

Notes

References
 .
 .

General topology
Topological spaces